Rohwedder or Rohweder is a German surname. Notable people with the surname include:

 Detlev Karsten Rohwedder (1932–1991), German manager and politician
 Joachim Rohweder (1841–1905), German ornithologist
 Niels Rohweder (1906–1993), Danish architect
 Otto Frederick Rohwedder (1880–1960), American inventor and engineer 
Otto Rohwedder (1909-1969), German footballer

German-language surnames
Surnames from nicknames